Nicolaas Marinus Hugenholtz (born 26 April 1924) is a Dutch physicist. He was a professor of theoretical physics at the University of Groningen between 1960 and 1989.

Hugenholtz was born in Wormerveer. He studied physics at Leiden University and obtained his degree in 1948. Hugenholtz subsequently studied theoretical physics under Hans Kramers. He obtained his PhD in physics at Utrecht University in 1957 with a thesis titled: "The quantum theory of large systems and its application to the structure of nuclear matter".

Hugenholtz was elected a member of the Royal Netherlands Academy of Arts and Sciences in 1988.

See also
Gross–Pitaevskii equation
KMS state

References

1924 births
Living people
20th-century Dutch physicists
Leiden University alumni
Members of the Royal Netherlands Academy of Arts and Sciences
People from Zaanstad
Theoretical physicists
Academic staff of the University of Groningen
Utrecht University alumni